James Rosenberg Racing was a V8 Supercar racing team owned by South Australian agricultural business identity, James Rosenberg. The team was reformed in 2010 with Tim Slade as the team's driver after a toe-in-the water year working with Paul Morris Motorsport in 2009.

Biography
The team began in the 1980s as a Sports Sedan team with Rosenberg himself as driver. In 1995 the opportunity presented to step into the Australian Touring Car Championship with the 1993 Bathurst winning Perkins Engineering Holden VP Commodore for Formula Holden front-runner Mark Poole. The team was considered a second-tier team within the ranks of the privateers, capable of reaching the top ten results on occasion. In mid-1999 the team upgraded to an ex Holden Racing Team VT Commodore before folding part way through the 2000 season.

Rosenberg became involved in the running of Australian Formula 3, and the emerging career of Tim Slade, assisting him into the Paul Morris Motorsport team for 2009.
Rosenberg announced the reformation of the team in December 2009 after acquiring a Racing Entitlement Contract from Paul Cruickshank Racing, to race a Stone Brothers Racing Ford FG Falcon for Tim Slade in 2010. This arrangement continued in 2011 and 2012 with a few podium positions. Between 2010 and 2012, The team shared a pit boom with Rod Nash Racing's entry.

As part of the sale of Stone Brothers Racing to Erebus Motorsport, James Rosenberg Racing campaigned a Mercedes-Benz E63 in 2013. The team struggled in 2013, with Slade recording just 4 Top 10 race finishes, at season's end Slade was 22nd in points. In 2013, the team shared a pit boom with Britek Motorsport.

In November 2013 James Rosenberg announced he would be taking his REC to operate a car out of the Walkinshaw Racing operation in 2014 with Nick Percat signed to drive.

The team closed at the end of 2014, with the REC returned to V8 Supercars.

Results

Complete Bathurst 1000 results

Gallery

References

Australian auto racing teams
Sports teams in Victoria (Australia)
Supercars Championship teams
1995 establishments in Australia
2014 disestablishments in Australia